Humla is a small island in Ålesund Municipality in Møre og Romsdal county, Norway.  It is located in the Borgundfjorden south and west of the island of Uksenøya, north of the island of Sula, and northwest of small island of Tørla.  There is a bridge connection from Humla to Tørla, and Tørla has a bridge to Uksenøya.  The island was part of Borgund Municipality until 1968 when it was merged into Ålesund Municipality. The 0.9-square-kilometre island has a population (2010) of 160.

See also
List of islands of Norway

References

Ålesund
Islands of Møre og Romsdal